A pastor (abbreviated as "Pr" or "Ptr" {singular}, or "Ps" {plural}) is the leader of a Christian congregation who also gives advice and counsel to people from the community or congregation. In Lutheranism, Catholicism, Eastern Orthodoxy, Oriental Orthodoxy and Anglicanism, pastors are always ordained. In Methodism, pastors may be either licensed or ordained.

Pastors are to act like shepherds by caring for the flock, and this care includes teaching. The New Testament typically uses the words "bishops" (Acts 20:28) and "presbyter" (1 Peter 5:1) to indicate the ordained leadership in early Christianity. Likewise, Peter instructs these particular servants to "act like shepherds" as they "oversee" the flock of God (1 Peter 5:2). The words "bishop" and "presbyter" were sometimes used in an interchangeable way, such as in Titus 1:5-6. However, there is ongoing dispute between branches of Christianity over whether there are two ordained classes (presbyters and deacons) or three (bishops, priests, and deacons). The first view is affirmed by the Presbyterian Church. On the other hand, Christians of the Roman Catholic, Persian, Eastern Orthodox, Oriental Orthodox, Moravian, Scandinavian Lutheran, Anglican, and Old Catholic, traditions maintain the latter view and affirm the doctrine of apostolic succession.

These terms describe a leader (e.g., bishop), one who maintains a careful watch for the spiritual needs of all the members of the flock (i.e., a pastor). The person must meet scriptural qualifications (1 Timothy 3:1-7; Titus 1:5-9). For some Protestants, whether called an elder, bishop, or pastor, these terms describe the same service in the church. In the early Church, only a man could be a presbyter, but many Protestant denominations in the 19th and 20th century have changed to allow women to be pastors. Whether man or woman, this person is to be older and experienced in the faith (i.e., an elder), a person who is a decision-maker, and a manager of church affairs.

The actual word pastor is derived from a Latin word meaning shepherd. When used as an ecclesiastical styling or title, the term may be abbreviated to "Pr" or "Ptr" (both singular), or "Ps" (plural).

History
The word "pastor" derives from the Latin noun  which means "shepherd" and is derived from the verb  – "to lead to pasture, set to grazing, cause to eat". The term "pastor" also relates to the role of elder within the New Testament, and is synonymous with the biblical understanding of minister. The term Pastor, Shepherd, and Elder are all the same position.  The term "Senior Pastor" does not exist in scripture, but - in multi-staffed churches - is commonly used to denote the pastor who does the preaching. Many Protestant churches call their ministers "pastors".

Present-day usage of the word is rooted in the Biblical metaphor of shepherding. The Hebrew Bible (or Old Testament) uses the Hebrew word  (roʿeh), which is used as a noun as in "shepherd", and as a verb as in "to tend a flock." It occurs 173 times in 144 Old Testament verses and relates to the literal feeding of sheep, as in Genesis 29:7. In Jeremiah 23:4, both meanings are used (ro'im is used for "shepherds" and yir'um for "shall feed them"), "And I will set up shepherds over them which shall feed them: and they shall fear no more, nor be dismayed, neither shall they be lacking, saith the LORD." (KJV).

English-language translations of the New Testament usually render the Greek noun  (poimēn) as "shepherd" and the Greek verb  (poimainō) as "feed". The two words occur a total of 29 times in the New Testament, most frequently referring to Jesus.  For example, Jesus called himself the "Good Shepherd" in John 10:11.  The same words in the familiar Christmas story (Luke 2) refer to literal shepherds.

In five New Testament passages though, the words relate to members of the church:
 John 21:16 - Jesus told Peter: "Feed My sheep"
 Acts 20:17 - the Apostle Paul summons the elders of the church in Ephesus to give a last discourse to them; in Acts 20:28, he tells them that the Holy Spirit has made them overseers, and they are to feed the church of God.
 1 Corinthians 9:7 - Paul says, of himself and the apostles: "who feedeth a flock, and eateth not of the milk of the flock?"
 Ephesians 4:11 - Paul wrote "And he gave some, apostles; and some, prophets; and some, evangelists; and some, pastors and teachers;"
 1 Peter 5:1-2 - Peter tells the elders among his readers that they are to, "Feed the flock of God which is among you, taking the oversight thereof"

Bishops of various denominations often bear a formal crosier in the form of a stylised shepherd's crook as a symbol of their pastoral/shepherding functions.

Historical usage 
Around 400 AD, Saint Augustine, a prominent African Catholic bishop, described a pastor's job: Disturbers are to be rebuked, the low-spirited to be encouraged, the infirm to be supported, objectors confuted, the treacherous guarded against, the unskilled taught, the lazy aroused, the contentious restrained, the haughty repressed, litigants pacified, the poor relieved, the oppressed liberated, the good approved, the evil borne with, and all are to be loved.

Current usage

Catholicism 

 
In the United States, the term pastor is used by Catholics for what in other English-speaking countries is called a parish priest. The Latin term used in the Code of Canon Law is parochus.

Lutheranism 
The Church of Sweden has a threefold ministry of bishop, priest, and deacon and those ordained to the presbyterate are referred to as priests. In the Evangelical Lutheran Church of Finland, ordained presbyters are referred to by various publications, including Finnish ones, as pastors, or priests. In the United States, denominations like the Lutheran Church–Missouri Synod, use the terms reverend and pastor interchangeably for ordained members of the clergy.

Baptist

The term "pastor", in the majority of Baptist churches, is one of two offices within the church, deacon being the other, and is considered synonymous with "elder" or "bishop" (though in Reformed Baptist churches, elders are a separate office).

In larger churches with many staff members, "Senior Pastor" commonly refers to the person who gives the sermons the majority of the time, with other persons having titles relating to their duties, for example "Worship Pastor" for the person leading singing.

Anglicanism 
Ordained presbyters are called priests in the Church of England, as in all other ecclesiastical provinces of the Anglican Communion, and use the title the Reverend if they are Low church and Father or Mother if they are High church. Those leaders who are not ordained, but have a license from their Bishop, are increasingly using the title Pastor, as well as those office holders who are communicants within the Anglican Communion and participate in lay ministry where a license is not required.

Methodism 

United Methodists ordain to the office of deacon and elder, each of whom can use the title of pastor depending. United Methodists also use the title of pastor for non-ordained clergy who are licensed and appointed to serve a congregation as their pastor or associate pastor, often referred to as licensed local pastors. These pastors may be lay people, seminary students, or seminary graduates in the ordination process, and cannot exercise any functions of clergy outside the charge where they are appointed.

Reformed 
The use of the term pastor to refer to the common Protestant title of modern times dates to the days of John Calvin and Huldrych Zwingli. Both men, and other Reformers, seem to have revived the term to replace the Roman Catholic priest in the minds of their followers. The pastor was considered to have a role separate from the board of presbyters. A "pastor" may be either ordained or commissioned, depending on the methods used to appoint a person into the role, with either way resulting in the same authority and responsibilities to provide shepherding and grace to a congregation.

Restorationist 
Some groups today view the pastor, bishop, and elder as synonymous terms or offices; many who do are descended from the Restoration Movement in America during the 19th century, such as the Disciples of Christ and the Churches of Christ.

Other religions
Other religions have started to use the term Pastor for their own ordained leader of congregation such as "Buddhist pastor".

Junior roles 

An assistant or associate pastor is a person who assists the pastor in a Christian church. The qualifications, responsibilities and duties vary depending on church and denomination.

In many churches, an assistant pastor is a pastor-in-training, or are awaiting full ordination. In many instances, they are granted limited powers and authority to act with, or in the absence of, the congregation's pastor. Some churches that have outreach programs, such as hospital visitations, in-home programs, prison ministries, or multiple chapels, will appoint assistant pastors to perform duties while the Pastor is busy elsewhere. Some churches use the title brother or ordained brother in place of assistant pastor.  In larger Roman Catholic parishes, the duties of an assistant pastor can be broken up into duties performed by deacons and non-ordained lay people.

See also 

 Clergy
 Dominie
 Ecclesiastical titles and styles
 Elder
 Herr Pastor
 Imam
 Minister of religion
 Murshid
 Pastoral care
 Pastoral counseling
 Pounding
 Preacher
 Priest
 Rabbi

Notes

References

External links 

 NewAdvent.org, The Catholic Encyclopedia's entry on the term pastor.
 LifeWay.com , Articles to help the pastor in the roles of preacher, missionary, leader, shepherd, and person.

Christian clergy by type
Christian religious occupations
Ecclesiastical titles
Local Christian church officials